Times Too is an album by American jazz saxophonist and vocalist Grace Kelly. It was released on December 15, 2005.

Times Too is Kelly's second release, a double disc, and features a blend between pop and jazz standards and originals. It was recorded when she was 13 years old.

Track listing
Disc one
"Isfahan" – 4:58
"All the Things You Are" – 3:58
"Fly Me to the Moon (In Other Words)" – 4:21
"You Stepped Out of a Dream" – 5:09
"'Round Midnight" – 7:44
"Leave Me or Leave Me" – 3:34
"Fast Metabolism" – 3:38
"Blood Count" – 6:48
 
Disc two
"Key to the Missing Door" – 4:56
"Oh Darling" – 4:29
"Cuttin' In" – 5:05
"Time to Be Free" – 3:12
"New Found Beat" – 3:26
"Time to Be Free" (Instrumental) – 3:34
"Time Tickin' Away" – 4:13
"Signed, Sealed, Delivered (I'm Yours)" – 3:55

Personnel
Grace Kelly – Alto saxophone, vocals
Doug Johnson – Piano
John Lockwood – Bass
Yoron Israel – Drums

Special guests
Adam Larrabee – Guitar
Nik Walker – Vocals
Ron Reid – Steel drums
Jeremy Udden – Alto saxophone

Reviews
 http://allmusic.com/album/times-too-r827853/review

References

2005 albums
Grace Kelly (musician) albums
Jazz albums by American artists